An oligarch or provincial lord (formerly the term petty king was also used) was a powerful lord who administered huge contiguous territories through usurping royal prerogatives in the Kingdom of Hungary in the late 13th and early 14th centuries.

List of oligarchs

Interregnum (1301–1310)
 Amadeus Aba (Northeast Hungary)
 Stephen Ákos (Borsod)
 Stephen Babonić (Lower Slavonia)
 James Borsa (Transtisia)
 Matthew Csák (Northwest Hungary)
 Ugrin Csák (Upper Syrmia)
 Dujam Frankopan (Primorje)
 Ladislaus Kán (Transylvania)
 Henry Kőszegi (Southern Transdanubia and Upper Slavonia)
 Ivan Kőszegi (Western Transdanubia)
 Stephen Dragutin Nemanjić (Lower Syrmia)
 Nicholas Pok (Szamosköz)
 Dominic Rátót (Nógrád)
 Paul Šubić (Croatia and Bosnia)
 Theodore Vejtehi (Severin)

References

Sources